Hugh Bamford Cott (6 July 1900 – 18 April 1987) was a British zoologist, an authority on both natural and military camouflage, and a scientific illustrator and photographer. Many of his field studies took place in Africa, where he was especially interested in the Nile crocodile, the evolution of pattern and colour in animals. During the Second World War, Cott worked as a camouflage expert for the British Army and helped to influence War Office policy on camouflage. His book Adaptive Coloration in Animals (1940), popular among serving soldiers, was the major textbook on camouflage in zoology of the twentieth century. After the war, he became a Fellow of Selwyn College, Cambridge. As a Fellow of the Zoological Society of London, he undertook expeditions to Africa and the Amazon to collect specimens, mainly reptiles and amphibians.

Life and career

Cott was born in Ashby Magna, Leicestershire, England, on 6 July 1900; his father was the rector there. He was schooled at Rugby. In 1919, he graduated from the Royal Military College, Sandhurst, and was commissioned into the Leicestershire Regiment. Between 1922 and 1925, he studied at Selwyn College, Cambridge.

He had intended to become a priest, and went to Cambridge to read theology, but after his first year he went on the university expedition to South America, where he studied natural forms in eastern Brazil in 1923, led by the entomologist Frank Balfour Browne, where he became fascinated by natural history, and changed his studies to zoology on his return. He then went on an expedition to the lower Amazon (1925–1926), and on research trips to the Zambesi river area in Africa (1927), including Mozambique, Zambia and East Africa, and Lanzarote (1930). He married Joyce Radford in 1928. He was a lecturer in Zoology at Bristol University from 1928 until 1932, when he moved to Glasgow University. He studied under another advocate of military camouflage, John Graham Kerr. His thesis, which he completed in 1935 under a Carnegie Fellowship, was on 'adaptive coloration' – both camouflage and warning coloration – in the Anura (frogs). In 1938 he was made a Doctor of Science at Glasgow, and he became a Zoology lecturer at Cambridge University and Strickland Curator of Birds at the university's Museum of Zoology.

Cott served in the Leicestershire Regiment of the British Army as a camouflage expert from 1919 to 1922, and, during the Second World War, with the Royal Engineers as a camouflage instructor from 1939 to 1945. Cott was chief instructor at the Camouflage Development and Training Centre at Helwan, Egypt, under filmmaker Geoffrey Barkas from its inception in November 1941.

After the war, Cott returned to Cambridge, becoming a Fellow of Selwyn College in 1945; he worked there until he retired in 1967. He gave the Fison Memorial Lecture of 1958 on 'Protective Coloration in Animals'. He continued to work from time to time after his retirement, for instance conducting a survey of crocodile nests on the Victoria Nile for the Uganda National Parks in 1972. He died at the age of 86 on 18 April 1987.

Camouflage

While trying to photograph a hen partridge on her nest, Cott waited for hours for the bird to return, finally taking some pictures of the empty nest before giving up. On developing the photographs, he realized the bird had been there all along, perfectly camouflaged.

As a camouflage expert during the Second World War, Cott likened the functions of military camouflage to those of protective coloration in nature. The three main categories of coloration in his book Adaptive Coloration in Animals are concealment, disguise, and advertisement. He studied, described and presented examples of such diverse camouflage effects as obliterative shading, disruption, differential blending, high contrast, coincident disruption, concealment of the eye, contour obliteration, shadow elimination, and mimicry. In his wartime lectures at Farnham Castle, he described nine categories of visual deception:

 merging, e.g. hare, polar bear
 disruption, e.g. ringed plover
 disguise, e.g. stick insect
 mis-direction, e.g. butterfly and fish eyespots
 dazzle, e.g. some grasshoppers
 decoy, e.g. angler fish
 smokescreen, e.g. cuttlefish
 the dummy, e.g. flies, ants
 false display of strength, e.g. toads, lizards

Cott's account of all this (illustrated by his own pen and ink drawings) is the 550-page book Adaptive Coloration in Animals (1940). It was proof-read by Kerr, who commented on its publication 'It is by far the finest thing of the kind in existence'. His co-workers' first-hand accounts of his work in military camouflage can be found in the memoirs of two of his fellow camoufleurs: Julian Trevelyan and Roland Penrose.

Peter Forbes wrote of Cott's book:

The book was written as war loomed, and published in wartime. Cott makes use of his knowledge of natural history to draw parallels between survival in nature and in war, and to advise on military camouflage, for example commenting:

Forbes notes that Adaptive Coloration in Animals is a narrative, short on the experimentation that followed after the war, but Forbes continues:

Cott attempted to persuade the British army to use more effective camouflage techniques, including countershading. For example, in August 1940, with the Battle of Britain imminent, he painted two rail-mounted coastal guns, one in conventional style, one countershaded. In aerial photographs, the countershaded gun is essentially invisible. Cott was triumphant, announcing:

However (like Kerr before him in the First World War), Cott did not succeed in influencing policy on camouflage, and he resigned from the Camouflage Advisory Panel in 1940.

Artwork

Cott was a founding member of the Society of Wildlife Artists, and a fellow of the Royal Photographic Society. From material gathered in field expeditions, he made contributions to the Cambridge University zoological museum.

Cott possessed considerable artistic skill. Like Abbott Thayer, he used his artistry in his scientific work, including in Adaptive Coloration in Animals, to help argue the case he was making.  For example, his black-and-white potoo shows this rainforest bird sitting motionless on a mottled tree trunk, its behaviour and disruptive pattern combining to provide effective camouflage. The philosopher and jazz musician David Rothenberg wrote of Cott's art:

Writings

In addition to Adaptive Coloration in Animals, Cott wrote two essays on camouflage: “Camouflage in nature and in war” and ”Animal form in relation to appearance”. As a scientific illustrator and photographer, he also wrote three other books: Zoological photography in practice (1956); Uganda in black and white (1959); and Looking at animals: a zoologist in Africa (1975). He became interested in the relationship of bird colours with their role as warning colours, an idea that arose when he observed hornets attracted to some birds being skinned while ignoring others. This led him to study the palatability of birds and their eggs. Among his papers were several studies on the relative palatibility of the eggs based initially on the preferences of ferrets, rats and hedgehogs and later on the use of a panel of expert egg tasters. In one study he found that of 123 species of bird, the kittiwake eggs scored highly with 8.2 out of 10.

Legacy

Forbes praised Cott's balance of science and artistry:

Over 60 years after its publication, Adaptive Coloration in Animals remains a core reference on the subject; the
evolutionary biologists Graeme Ruxton, Thomas N. Sherratt and Michael Speed conclude their book on animal coloration by writing

The biologist Steven Vogel commented that:

An exhibition of his art, writing, and photographs, 'Life, Lines & Illusion', was held at the Nature in Art gallery in Gloucester in September and October 2018.

References

Bibliography

By Cott

 Books
 
 Cott, Hugh B. (1975). Looking at Animals: a Zoologist in Africa. Scribner.
 Cott, Hugh B. (1959). Uganda in Black and White. Macmillan.
 Cott, Hugh B. (1956). Zoological Photography in Practice. Fountain Press.

 Journals
 
 
 
 
 Cott, Hugh B. (1938). Wonder Island of the Amazon Delta; on Marajo Cowboys Ride Oxen, Tree-Dwelling Animals Throng Dense Forests. National Geographic Magazine.

About Cott

External links

 Janus: Cott's papers
 Archives Hub: Cott's own copies of books, with personal annotations, at Cambridge University Museum of Zoology
 University of Glasgow Story: Hugh Bamford Cott

Scientific illustrators
Military personnel from Leicestershire
20th-century British zoologists
Photographers from Leicestershire
Alumni of the University of Glasgow
Fellows of Selwyn College, Cambridge
British Army personnel of World War II
Graduates of the Royal Military College, Sandhurst
1900 births
1987 deaths
Royal Engineers officers
Camoufleurs
British naturalists
Alumni of Selwyn College, Cambridge
People from Harborough District
English nature writers
Camouflage researchers
20th-century naturalists